Directorate of Seamen and Emigration Welfare is a Bangladesh government is a directorate under the Ministry of Shipping responsible for the welfare of seamen and those employed in water vessels. Commodore Syed Ariful Islam is the Director General of the Directorate of Seamen and Emigration Welfare.

History
Directorate of Seamen and Emigration Welfare was established by 1971 soon after the Independence of Bangladesh. The government combined Directorate of Seamen's Welfare, National Employment Bureau, and Protector of Emigrants to form the Directorate of Seamen and Emigration Welfare.

References

1972 establishments in Bangladesh
Organisations based in Dhaka
Government agencies of Bangladesh
Government directorates of Bangladesh